Nyenga, may refer to one of the following:
 Nyenga, Kenya, a settlement in Nyanza Province, western Kenya
 Nyenga, Uganda, a village in Buikwe District, Central Uganda